Bairdemys is an extinct genus of side-necked turtles in the family Podocnemididae. The genus existed from the Late Oligocene to Late Miocene and its fossils have been found in South Carolina, Puerto Rico, Panama and Venezuela. The genus was described in 2002 by Gaffney & Wood and the type species is B. hartsteini.

Description 
The first species in the genus described was B. venezuelensis as Podocnemis venezuelensis by Wood and Díaz de Gamero in 1971.

Species 
 B. hartsteini 
 B. healeyorum 
 B. sanchezi 
 B. thalassica 
 B. venezuelensis 
 B. winklerae

Phylogeny 
Bairdemys was placed phylogenetically by Ferreira et al. in 2015.

Distribution 

Fossils of Bairdemys have been found in:
Late Oligocene
 Chandler Bridge Formation, Arikareean, South Carolina
Early-Mid Miocene
 Cibao Formation, Hemingfordian, Puerto Rico
 El Miedo Cave, Capadare and Castillo Formations, Laventan, Venezuela
Late Miocene
 Alajuela Formation, earliest Clarendonian, Panama
 Urumaco Formation, Chasicoan, Venezuela

See also 
 Carbonemys
 Stupendemys

References

Bibliography

Further reading 
 

Podocnemididae
Prehistoric turtle genera
Miocene turtles
Oligocene turtles
Chattian first appearances
Tortonian genus extinctions
Chattian life
Aquitanian life
Burdigalian life
Serravallian
Langhian life
Tortonian life
Oligocene reptiles of North America
Paleogene United States
Miocene reptiles of North America
Arikareean
Clarendonian
Neogene Panama
Fossils of Panama
Neogene United States
Fossils of the United States
Miocene reptiles of South America
Laventan
Chasicoan
Neogene Venezuela
Fossils of Venezuela
Fossil taxa described in 2002
Taxa named by Eugene S. Gaffney